Ichnotropis  bivittata also known as the Angolan rough-scaled lizard , is a species of lizard found in Tanzania, Democratic Republic of the Congo, Angola, Zambia, Malawi, and Gabon.

References

Ichnotropis
Lizards of Africa
Reptiles of Angola
Reptiles of the Democratic Republic of the Congo
Reptiles of Gabon
Reptiles of Malawi
Reptiles of Tanzania
Reptiles of Zimbabwe
Reptiles described in 1866
Taxa named by José Vicente Barbosa du Bocage